São Tomé and Príncipe competed at the 2019 African Games held from 19 to 31 August 2019 in Rabat, Morocco. In total, athletes representing São Tomé and Príncipe won one gold medal, one silver medal and one bronze medal and the country finished 25th in the medal table. All medals were won in canoeing.

Medal summary

Medal table 

|  style="text-align:left; width:78%; vertical-align:top;"|

|  style="text-align:left; width:22%; vertical-align:top;"|

Athletics 

In total, five athletes represented São Tomé and Príncipe in athletics.

Gorete Semedo competed in the women's 100 metres event and she reached the semifinals. She was disqualified in the semifinals after a false start. Gorete Semedo also competed in the women's 200 metres event and she finished in 28th place in the heats.

Agate de Sousa competed in the women's 100 metres and she finished in 26th place in the heats; she did not advance to the semifinals. She also competed in the women's long jump event and she finished in 7th place.

Esmaiel Freitas competed in the men's 200 metres event and he finished in 42nd place in the heats. He also competed in the men's 400 metres event where he finished in 41st place in the heats.

Gilberto Leite competed in the men's 800 metres event and he finished in 29th place in the heats.

Dúdú Cruz was scheduled to compete in the men's long jump event but he did not start.

Canoeing 

São Tomé and Príncipe competed in canoeing. Buly Da Conceição Triste won one gold medal, one silver medal and one bronze medal.

He won the gold medal in the men's C-2 1000 metres event (together with Roque Fernandes Dos Ramos), the silver medal in the men's C-1 1000 metres event and the bronze medal in the men's C-1 200 metres event. As a result of winning the gold medal in the men's C-2 1000 metres event São Tomé and Príncipe qualified one boat to compete in that event at the 2020 Summer Olympics.

Chess 

Four chess players represented São Tomé and Príncipe in chess and they took part in all five events. No medals were won.

Taekwondo 

Three athletes competed in Taekwondo.

References 

Nations at the 2019 African Games
2019
African Games